Gooch's American Regiment was a Regiment of Foot recruited in British North America, and put on the British establishment. It served in the expedition to Cartagena 1741, suffering heavy losses primarily from sickness. The regiment had a poor reputation and was regarded as undisciplined. It was severely neglected by the British government, and by the British military leadership, who did not feed or pay them at the base in Jamaica, and misused them as seamen during the expedition.

Formation
During the War of Jenkins' Ear, a major British assault on Cartagena de Indias was planned and carried out. The British government urged its colonies in North America to raise soldiers for this undertaking; the 3,000 men asked for were rapidly reached and exceeded. Only Virginia used impressment, forcing former indentured servants and convicts to enlist. Pennsylvania enlisted 300 indentured servants that volunteered, thereby breaching their indenture. Massachusetts raised five companies; Rhode Island two; Connecticut two; New York five; New Jersey three; Pennsylvania eight; Maryland three; Virginia four; and North Carolina four, for a total of 36 companies, organized in four battalions. As an innovation, and in breach of precedent, the men so raised would be borne on the British Establishment, the cost borne by the British  taxpayers; the officers granted the right to half pay, in the same way as later Shirley's and Pepperrell's regiments also raised in the colonies. Alexander Spotswood was first designated as colonel of the new regiment, but after his death the deputy governor of Virginia, Sir William Gooch, was commissioned colonel; the rest of the field officers came from the British army, while the company officers originated in the colonial elite, although one lieutenant and one sergeant per company was to be British. The best known of the North American officers was Captain Lawrence Washington, George Washington's older half-brother. The formal organization contained one colonel, four lieutenant-colonels, four majors, 36 captains, 72 lieutenants, four adjutants, four quartermasters, one surgeon, four surgeon's mates, 144 sergeants, 144 corporals, 72 drummers, and 3,240 sentinels (i.e. privates).

Expedition to Cartagena
The British contingent of the expedition sailed from England in early November 1740, four months delayed. When they met up with the British fleet under Admiral Vernon at Jamaica in January 1741, sickness and scurvy were rife among the troops, and the army commander, Lord Cathcart dead of disease. The American Regiment was already on the island, but not at all ready for service. The London government had made no efforts to pay or feed the North American contingent, so the colonial soldiers, quite undisciplined to begin with, were on the verge of rioting; sickness was even more rampant among the Americans than among the British. The expedition sailed however, and by the middle of March was at the coast of the Spanish Main. To reach Cartagena, the fleet had to force entry through a small passage, Boca Chica, defended by three forts. The troops were landed, except the American Regiment, of which only 300 soldiers were trusted to leave the ships due to the regiment's unruliness. Having opened the passage by taking the forts, the troops reembarked and the fleet continued towards Cartagena. 

By April 20, the new army commander, General Wentworth, led a force attacking the outworks of Cartagena. The American soldiers were detailed to carry scaling ladders and woolpacks for the storming columns, but during the attack at Fort St. Lazar they threw down their burdens and fled, leaving the attackers without means to carry the walls. A Spanish counterattack threatened to cut off the troops from the ships, and the British force had to withdraw. Yellow fever was now rampant among the troops; half the force was incapacitated. The army reembarked, and the fleet returned to the coast where the soldiers lay dying without care on the troopships. In early May, the fleet and the troops returned to Jamaica. The sickness did not abate, however, and by this time the British troops were reduced to thirteen hundred men, and the Americans to fourteen hundred.

Disbandment
In August, the British command decided to invade Cuba, and on August 29 the fleet anchored at Cumberland Bay, about 90 miles from Santiago de Cuba, landing men and supplies; the troops remained in camp without any offensive movements until November however, when they reembarked and returned to Jamaica. Sickness continued; reinforcements with three thousand fresh troops from England in February 1742 soon fell ill and started to die. In March an attempt to attack Portobelo was launched, but had to be aborted before arriving on the Spanish Main due to sickness, and the expedition returned yet again to Jamaica. In October, the remnants of the American Regiment were discharged and the regiment disbanded. Of 4,163 officers and men in the regiment, only 1,463 survived. The surviving officers were receiving half-pay for the rest of their lives, but only after having appeared before a Board of Generals in London, pleading their case.

Morale
According to Fortescue, the Americans were distrusted by the whole army, but there were also plenty of reasons for the Americans to distrust, and feel betrayed by, the British government and the British military leadership, besides the rampant diseases that everyone fell victim to, irrespective of rank or origin, and the lack of surgeons and stores on the hospital ships, that all suffered equally. The lack of pay and subsistence on Jamaica, forced the officers of the regiment to take personal loans at exorbitant interests from the local merchants in order to feed the men. At Cartagena, large detachments from the American Regiment were employed as pioneers, together with enslaved Africans from Jamaica who had been temporarily conscripted from their owners; being relegated into performing logistical work alongside slaves further sapped the American morale. Most of the regiment's soldiers served aboard the naval ships, as marines or seamen, the latter being a clear breach of their terms of enlistment. Aboard they faced one ignominy after the other; not being furnished with berths or hammocks, having to do all the dirty and heavy work, being moved from ship to ship without their officers' knowledge, some even badly beaten by the ships' officers, constantly harassed by the sailors who threw their clothing overboard. In February 1742, the field officers of the regiment protested in a memorial to General Wentworth, who brought their complaints to the attention of Admiral Vernon, but to no avail.

Uniforms
The men of Gooch's American Regiment wore red uniform coats with brown waistcoats, and canvas trousers. The facing and lining were red, and the trousers white. The officers wore red uniform coats, with red facing and lining, green waistcoats with lace, red breeches, and white gaiters.

References

Citations

Cited literature
 Adams, James Truslow (1927). Revolutionary New England 1691–1776. Boston: Little, Brown, and Company.
 Carr, J. Revell (2008). Seeds of Discontent: The Deep Roots of the American Revolution, 1650–1750. New York: Walker & Company.
 Dziennik, Mathew P. (2016). "The Fiscal-Military State and Labor in the Atlantic World." In: A. Graham & P. Walsh (eds.). The British Fiscal-Military State 1660–c1783. London: Routledge.
 Foote, Willam A. (1963). "Pennsylvania Men of the American Regiment." Pennsylvania Magazine of History and Biography, vol. 87(1): 31–38. 
 Fortescue, J.W. (1899). A History of the British Army. Volume II. London: McMillan.
 Gallay, Alan (1996). Colonial Wars of North America, 1512–1763. New York: Garland Publishing, Inc.
 Hayter, Tony (1994). "The Army and the first British Empire 1714–1783." In: D. G. Chandler & I. Beckett (eds.). The Oxford History of the British Army. Oxford University Press.
 Jones, Alfred (1922). "The American Regiment in the Carthagena Expedition." The Virginia Magazine of History and Biography, vol. 30 (2): 1–20.
 Powell, William S. (ed.) (1988). Dictionary of North Carolina Biography. Chapel Hill: University of North Carolina Press.
 Rea, Robert R. (1990). Major Robert Farmar of Mobile. Tuscaloosa: University of Alabama Press.
 Reid, Stuart (1995). King George's Army 1740–93 (1). Osprey Publishing.
 Stachiaw, Myron O. (1979). Massachusetts officers and soldiers, 1723–1743. The Society of Colonial Wars in the Commonwealth of Massachusetts.

Infantry regiments of the British Army
Military units and formations of the War of Jenkin's Ear
Military units and formations established in 1739
1742 disestablishments in North America
1739 establishments in the British Empire
1740s in the Thirteen Colonies